Test cricket is the oldest form of cricket played at international level. A Test match is scheduled to take place over a period of five days, and is played by teams representing full member nations of the International Cricket Council (ICC).

Afghanistan played their first test match in 2018, becoming the 12th test nation. Since then, they have played 5 test matches, compiling a record of 2 wins and 3 defeats. 

This is a list of Afghanistan Test cricket records.  It is based on the List of Test cricket records, but concentrates solely on records dealing with Afghanistan Test cricket team, and any cricketers who have played for that team.

Key
The top five records are listed for each category, except for the team wins, losses, draws and ties and the partnership records. Tied records for fifth place are also included. Explanations of the general symbols and cricketing terms used in the list are given below. Specific details are provided in each category where appropriate. All records include matches played for Afghanistan only, and are correct .

Team records

Team wins, losses, draws and ties 
, Afghanistan has played 6 Test matches resulting in 3 victories and 3 defeats for an overall winning percentage of 50.00.

First Test series wins

First Test match wins

Team scoring records

Most runs in an innings

Highest successful run chases

Fewest runs in an innings

Most runs conceded in an innings

Fewest runs conceded in an innings

Result records

Greatest win margins (by runs)

Greatest win margins (by wickets)

Narrowest win margins (by runs)

Narrowest win margins (by wickets)

Greatest loss margins (by innings)

Greatest loss margins (by 10 wickets)

Individual records

Batting records

Most career runs

Most runs against each team

Most runs in each batting position

Highest individual score

Highest individual score – progression of record

Highest individual score against each team

Highest career average

Highest Average in each batting position

Most half-centuries

Most centuries

Most double centuries

Most triple centuries
No Afghanistan batsmen has scored a triple century yet in Test cricket.

Most Sixes

Most Fours

Most runs in a series

Most ducks in career

Bowling records

Most career wickets

Most wickets against each team

Best figures in an innings

Best bowling figures against each team

Best figures in a match

Best career average

Best career economy rate

Best career strike rate

Most five-wicket hauls in an innings

Most ten-wicket hauls in a match

Worst figures in an innings

Worst figures in a match

Most wickets in a series

Wicket-keeping records

Most career dismissals

Most career catches

Most career stumpings

Most dismissals in an innings

Most dismissals in a match

Most dismissals in a series

Fielding records

Most career catches

Most catches in a series

Other records

Most career matches

Most consecutive career matches

Most matches as captain

Youngest players on Debut

Oldest players on Debut

Oldest players

Partnership records

Highest partnerships by wicket

Highest partnerships by runs

Umpiring records

Most matches umpired

Notes

References

Test cricket
Test cricket records
Afghanistan